Asha Lul Mohamud Yusuf is a contemporary Somali poet who has lived in exile in Britain since over 25 years.

Yusuf's dual-language Somali-English collection The Sea-Migrations was named as one of 2017's best poetry books of the year by both Jeremy Noel-Tod and Carol Rumens. Yusuf is a skilled woman poet in a field mostly generated by men, she is a master of many forms of Somali poetry like gabay that uses alliteration and rhythm to bring its argument across. She is a prominent figure in the Somali diaspora community through her engagement via her YouTube Channel and Whats App chain messages. She also is the host of a Somali TV show based in the UK.

Works
 The Sea-Migrations: Tahriib. Translated by Clare Pollard, Said Jama Hussein and Maxamed Xasan ‘Alto’. Bloodaxe Books, 2017.
Taste: Dookh. Translated by Maxamed Xasan ‘Alto’, Clare Pollard. The Poetry Translation Centre, 2012.

References

Year of birth missing (living people)
Living people
Somalian poets
Somalian women writers
Somalian women poets
20th-century Somalian women writers
20th-century Somalian writers
21st-century Somalian women writers
21st-century Somalian writers
20th-century poets
21st-century poets
Somali-language writers